Rolling Home: A Cross Canada Railroad Memoir is a non-fiction memoir, written by Canadian writer Tom Allen, first published in October 2001 by Penguin Books. In the book, the author chronicles his travels across Canada on a train. Allen includes his interviews with passengers, engineers, cooks, and porters. Rolling Home has been called an "evocative cross-country tour of Canada by train," by Staebler award administrator Kathryn Wardropper.

Awards and honours
Rolling Home received the 2002 "Edna Staebler Award for Creative Non-Fiction".

See also
List of Edna Staebler Award recipients

References

External links
Tom Allen, Home page, Retrieved 11/23/2012

Canadian non-fiction books
2001 non-fiction books
Canadian memoirs